T'ula Jayani Apachita (Hispanicized spelling Thola Jayani Apacheta) is a mountain in the Bolivian Andes. It is situated in the Cochabamba Department, Quillacollo Province, Quillacollo Municipality, southwest of the lake Parinani.

See also 
 Tunari
 Wari Warini

References 

Mountains of Cochabamba Department